South Kings Peak is the second highest peak in Utah, United States with an elevation of . It lies just south of the spine of the central Uinta Mountains, in the Ashley National Forest in northeastern Utah, in north-central Duchesne County. It lies within the boundaries of the High Uintas Wilderness.

See also
 
 
 Kings Peak

References

External links

 
 

Mountains of Utah
Features of the Uinta Mountains
Mountains of Duchesne County, Utah
Ashley National Forest